The 2020 United States House of Representatives elections in Missouri was held on November 3, 2020, to elect the eight U.S. representatives from the state of Missouri, one from each of the state's eight congressional districts. The elections coincided with the 2020 United States presidential election, as well as other elections to the House of Representatives, elections to the United States Senate and various state and local elections.

The primaries were held on August 4.

Overview

District 1

The 1st district is of the city of St. Louis and much of northern St. Louis County, including Florissant and University City. The incumbent is Democrat Lacy Clay, who was re-elected with 80.1% of the vote in 2018.

Democratic primary

Candidates

Declared
Katherine Bruckner, candidate for MO-91 in 2008
Cori Bush, civil rights activist, candidate for Missouri's 1st congressional district in 2018, and candidate for U.S. Senate in 2016
Lacy Clay, incumbent U.S. Representative

Endorsements

Polling

Primary results

Republican primary

Candidates

Declared
Winnie Heartstrong, activist
Anthony Rogers, radio show host

Primary results

Libertarian primary

Candidates

Declared
Alex Furman,  Vice President of the St. Louis chapter of the far-right neo-fascist organization Proud Boys

Primary results

General election

Predictions

Polling

Results

District 2

The 2nd district is based in eastern Missouri, and includes the southern and western suburbs of St. Louis, including Arnold, Town and Country, Wildwood, Chesterfield, and Oakville. The incumbent is Republican Ann Wagner, who was re-elected with 51.2% of the vote in 2018.

Republican primary

Candidates

Declared
Ann Wagner, incumbent U.S. Representative

Primary results

Democratic primary

Candidates

Declared
Jill Schupp, state senator

Declined
Becky Morgan, leader of the Missouri chapter of Moms Demand Action for Gun Sense in America
Cort VanOstran, attorney and nominee for Missouri's 2nd congressional district in 2018

Endorsements

Primary results

Libertarian primary

Candidates

Declared
Martin Schulte

Primary results

General election

Predictions

Polling

with Generic Republican and Generic Democrat

Results

District 3

The third district encompasses east-central Missouri, taking in Jefferson City, Troy, O'Fallon, and Washington. The incumbent is Republican Blaine Luetkemeyer, who was re-elected with 65.1% of the vote in 2018.

Republican primary

Candidates

Declared
Adela Wisdom, anti-prohibition activist
Blaine Luetkemeyer, incumbent U.S. Representative
Jeffrey Nowak, former marine
Lynette Trares, Missouri State Department of Health and Senior Services employee
Brandon Wilkinson, truck driver

Primary results

Democratic primary

Candidates

Declared
Dennis Oglesby, chairman of Warren County Democrats
Megan Rezabek, maintenance worker

Primary results

Libertarian primary

Candidates

Declared
Leonard Steinman III, perennial candidate

Primary results

General election

Predictions

Polling

Results

District 4

The 4th district is based in predominantly rural west-central Missouri, taking in Columbia, Sedalia, Warrensburg, and Lebanon. The incumbent is Republican Vicky Hartzler, who was re-elected with 64.8% of the vote in 2018.

Republican primary

Candidates

Declared
Neal Gist, software engineer
Vicky Hartzler, incumbent U.S. Representative

Primary results

Democratic primary

Candidates

Declared
Lindsey Simmons, attorney

Primary results

Libertarian primary

Candidates

Declared
Steven K. Koonse, retiree and Libertarian candidate for Missouri's 4th congressional district in 2018
Robert Smith, small business owner

Primary results

General election

Predictions

Polling
Polls with a sample size of <100 have their sample size entries marked in red to indicate a lack of reliability.

Results

District 5

The 5th district primarily consists of the inner ring of the Kansas City metropolitan area, including nearly all of Kansas City south of the Missouri River. The incumbent is Democrat Emanuel Cleaver, who was re-elected with 61.7% of the vote in 2018.

Democratic primary

Candidates

Declared
Emanuel Cleaver, incumbent U.S. Representative
Maite Salazar, progressive activist

Primary results

Republican primary

Candidates

Declared
Jerry Barham, gas station owner
Clay Chastain, transportation activist
Ryan Derks, investment manager
R.H. Hess, ICWA child custody law advocate and deacon
Richonda Oaks, analyst and dominionist
Weldon "Wilbur" Woodward, beekeeper

Primary results

Libertarian primary

Candidates

Declared
Robin Dominick

Primary results

General election

Predictions

Polling

Results

District 6

The 6th district encompasses rural northern Missouri, St. Joseph and much of Kansas City north of the Missouri River. The incumbent is Republican Sam Graves, who was re-elected with 65.4% of the vote in 2018.

Republican primary

Candidates

Declared
Sam Graves, incumbent U.S. Representative
Chris Ryan, perennial candidate

Primary results

Democratic primary

Candidates

Declared
Henry Martin, U.S. Army veteran
Gena L. Ross, college professor
Donald Robert Sartain
Charles West, Clark County school board member
Ramona Farris, consultant

Primary results

Libertarian primary

Candidates

Declared
Jim Higgins, former vice chairman of the Missouri Libertarian Party

Primary results

General election

Predictions

Polling
Polls with a sample size of <100 have their sample size entries marked in red to indicate a lack of reliability.

Results

District 7

The 7th district is located in southwestern Missouri, taking in Springfield, Joplin, Branson, and Nixa. The incumbent is Republican Billy Long, who was re-elected with 66.2% of the vote in 2018.

Republican primary

Candidates

Declared
Steve Chetnik, manufacturing worker
Eric Harleman, businessman
Camille Lombardi-Olive, perennial candidate
Billy Long, incumbent U.S. Representative
Kevin VanStory, real estate broker

Primary results

Democratic primary

Candidates

Declared
Teresa Montseny, historian (Dropped out)

Primary results

Libertarian primary

Candidates

Declared
Kevin Craig

Primary results

General election

Predictions

Polling

Results

District 8

The 8th district is the most rural district of Missouri, taking in rural southeastern Missouri, including the Missouri Bootheel, as well as the cities of Cape Girardeau and Poplar Bluff. The incumbent is Republican Jason Smith, who was re-elected with 73.4% of the vote in 2018.

Republican primary

Candidates

Declared
Jason Smith, incumbent U.S. Representative

Primary results

Democratic primary

Candidates

Declared
Kathy Ellis, social worker and nominee for Missouri's 8th congressional district in 2018

Primary results

Libertarian primary

Candidates

Declared
Tom Schmitz

Primary results

General election

Predictions

Polling
Polls with a sample size of <100 have their sample size entries marked in red to indicate a lack of reliability.

Results

Notes

Partisan clients

References

External links
 
 
  (State affiliate of the U.S. League of Women Voters)
 

Official campaign websites for 1st district candidates
 Cori Bush (D) for Congress
 Alex Furman (L) for Congress
 Anthony Rogers (R) for Congress

Official campaign websites for 2nd district candidates
 Martin Schulte (L) for Congress
 Jill Schupp (D) for Congress 
 Ann Wagner (R) for Congress

Official campaign websites for 3rd district candidates
 Blaine Luetkemeyer (R) for Congress
 Megan Rezabek (D) for Congress

Official campaign websites for 4th district candidates
 Vicky Hartzler (R) for Congress
 Lindsey Simmons (D) for Congress

Official campaign websites for 5th district candidates
 Emanuel Cleaver (D) for Congress
 Ryan Derks (R) for Congress
 Robin Dominick (L) for Congress

Official campaign websites for 6th district candidates
 Sam Graves (R) for Congress
 Gena L. Ross (D) for Congress

Official campaign websites for 7th district candidates
 Kevin Craig (L) for Congress
 Billy Long (R) for Congress
 Teresa Montseny (D) for Congress 

Official campaign websites for 8th district candidates
 Kathy Ellis (D) for Congress
 Tom Schmitz (L) for Congress
 Jason Smith (R) for Congress

2020
Missouri
United States House of Representatives